Neraudia ovata, commonly known as Big Island maoloa, is a species of flowering plant in the nettle family, Urticaceae, that is endemic to the Big Island of Hawaii. It inhabits dry forests growing on lava flows in the island's Kona District. It is threatened by habitat loss. It is a federally listed endangered species of the United States. There are no more than 18 mature individuals persisting in natural populations, and some individuals which have been planted in appropriate habitat.

References

ovata
Endemic flora of Hawaii
Critically endangered plants
Taxonomy articles created by Polbot